Kathy Muehlemann (born 1950) is an American abstract painter who was born in Austin, Texas and earned a B.F.A. from State University of New York, Empire State College in 1978.  She also studied fresco painting in Italy.  Muehlemann is currently chair of the Art Department and professor of art at Randolph College.  He husband, Jim Muehlemann is also an artist and professor at Randolph College.

The artist describes her style as "metaphoric abstraction".  It consists of an allover deployment of geometric images, often suggesting celestial objects, as in Hypnotic Flight, from the collection of the Honolulu Museum of Art.  The Ackland Art Museum (Chapel Hill, NC), the Albright–Knox Art Gallery (Buffalo, NY), the Cleveland Museum of Art, the Grey Art Gallery (New York City), the Honolulu Museum of Art, the Maier Museum of Art (Lynchburg, VA), the Milwaukee Art Museum, the Museum of Contemporary Art (Miami, FL), the Nelson-Atkins Museum of Art (Kansas City, MO), and The Phillips Collection (Washington, D.C.) are among the public collections holding works by Kathy Muehlemann.

References
 Barnes, Susan, Altogether, Elsewhere: Recent Work of Kathy Muehlemann, Pamela Auchincloss Gallery, New York, 1991
 Clearwater, Bonnie and Stephen Westfall, Kathy Muehlemann, Lannan Museum, Lake Worth, 1989
 Monaghan, Kathleen, The Poetics of Reverie: Recent Paintings by Kathy Muehlemann, The Hyde Collection Art Museum, Glens Falls, 1998
 Scott, Deborah Emont, Kathy Muehlemann, Nelson-Atkins Museum of Art, Kansas City, 1991

Footnotes

1950 births
20th-century American painters
Abstract painters
Expressionist painters
Living people
21st-century American painters
Randolph College faculty
Empire State College alumni
American women painters
20th-century American women
21st-century American women